José Aparecido dos Santos , also known as. Cidinho Santos (born June 19, 1968 in Janiópolis, Paraná) is a Brazilian businessman and politician, member of the Liberal Party (PL).

Santos served as mayor of the city of Nova Marilândia (MT) for three terms. He also served with the Mato-grossense Counties Association.

In the 2010 elections, he was elected as first substitute of Blairo Maggi in the Federal Senate. Santos assumed the office in many opportunities, the last being due to Maggi's nomination to the Ministry of Agriculture on the government of President Michel Temer.

References

Living people
1968 births
Members of the Federal Senate (Brazil)
Mayors of places in Brazil
Liberal Party (Brazil, 2006) politicians
People from Paraná (state)